Lustymore Island  is an island located in Lower Lough Erne, County Fermanagh, Northern Ireland.

Nearby is Boa Island whose Caldragh cemetery has a carved Janus type figure. A second figure was brought to Caldragh in 1939 from Lustymore Island. In the early 20th century, Lady Hunt from Alberta, Canada owned both Lustymore and Lustybeg islands. When her residence, Glenvar House, accidentally burned down, she moved to Germany.

References

Culture Northern Ireland

Islands of County Fermanagh
Lake islands of Northern Ireland